Arlington Franklin Dungy was a Canadian dentist who practiced in Ontario, and was a known advocate for a more inclusive medical community. He specialized in paediatric dentistry, and practiced first in Toronto, before accepting the role of Chief of Dentistry at Ottawa's Children’s Hospital of Eastern Ontario. His academic career included the positions of Dean of Alumni and Student Affairs and Associate Dean of Professional Affairs, at the University of Ottawa Faculty of Medicine. During his tenure at the University of Ottawa, he co-founded the Indigenous admissions program, as well as two scholarships, to address a lack of Indigenous representation within the Canadian medical profession. He was fondly known as "Arlie" by people close to him.

Education 
Arlington Dungy attended the University of Toronto, where he obtained his Doctor of Dental Surgery (DDS). Graduating in 1956, he became one of the first known black graduates from the school's Faculty of Dentistry. He later went on to obtain a specialist diploma in paediatric dentistry in 1970, also from the University of Toronto.

Career 
After graduating with his DDS, Dungy had a long professional career in dentistry. He became the chief of paedodontics at Toronto’s Hospital for Sick Children in 1969. Dungy was then recruited as Chief of Dentistry for Ottawa’s Children’s Hospital of Eastern Ontario in 1981. By 1995, he held the position of Vice-President academic research, and medical affairs.

Dungy's academic career spanned 25 years. First as an adjunct professor of surgery at the University of Ottawa Faculty of Medicine, he then went on to help found a student affairs office. He later would hold the positions of associate Dean of Alumni and Student Affairs, and Associate Dean of Professional Affairs. In 2006, he became the first director of the Indigenous Admissions program at the University of Ottawa's Faculty of Medicine.

Advocacy work 
Self-identifying as an African-American, Dungy stated that his own experiences with prejudice in his community facilitated his desire to create a more diverse and inclusive community for other marginalized groups with the field of medicine. He played a key role as part of a small team, that also included Dr. Peter Walker, in founding the Indigenous Admissions program at University of Ottawa Faculty of Medicine.

The Indigenous Admissions program launched in 2006, originally admitting seven students in its first year, and six in its second. The program was funded jointly by both federal and provincial levels of government. The program originally held eight out of 150 places at the medical school for applicants from First Nations, Inuit and Métis backgrounds. Its goal was to graduate more than 100 medical students by 2020 to address a lack of indigenous medical professionals in Canda, and improve Indigenous healthcare on reserves and in cities.  Dungy was the first director of this program. He hoped other Canadian medical schools would follow the example of the Indigenous Admission program by setting up similar programs.

Dungy also created two scholarship funds for University of Ottawa medical students. In 1997 he founded the Hilda Rebecca Dungy Memorial Scholarship, to provide financial aid to students from the Faculty of Medicine.  Later, upon his retirement, he also created the Dr. Arlington F. Dungy Scholarship for Students in the Faculty of Medicine's Indigenous Program.

Personal life 
Dungy was originally from Windsor Ontario and also went by the name Arlie. He was married to Susan Barclay and had two children. Dungy passed away on April 30th 2016, after battling Alzheimer's disease.

References 

Canadian dentists
Year of birth missing
2016 deaths